Henry Stewart Treviranus (19 September 1918 – 29 February 2008) was a Canadian equestrian. He competed in two events at the 1952 Summer Olympics.

References

1918 births
2008 deaths
Canadian male equestrians
Olympic equestrians of Canada
Equestrians at the 1952 Summer Olympics
People from Cuxhaven